The FIBA Africa Basketball League (formerly named the FIBA Africa Clubs Champions Cup) was the highest caliber men's professional basketball competition for clubs until 2020, organized by the FIBA Africa and played by the champions of the leagues of the African countries. The league was replaced by the Basketball Africa League (BAL) from 2020.

History
The competition was founded in 1971. A year later, in 1972, Hit Trésor SC won the inaugural championship. For the first 33 years in existence, it was a biennial league. From 2004, the ACC was held yearly.

Notable players who have played in the competition are Serge Ibaka and Bismack Biyombo, who both went on to play in the United States' National Basketball Association (NBA).

In February 2019, FIBA Africa announced the reformulation of the league, expanding it from 12 to 16 teams. The name of the tournament was changed to "FIBA Africa Basketball League", or "FIBA AfroLeague". 

FIBA has in the past announced plans to expand the FIBA Intercontinental Cup to possibly include the champion teams from the FIBA Africa Basketball League, FIBA Asia Champions Cup, NBL from Australia, and possibly the NBA, at some point in the future.

Results 
The following is a list of all the winners of the FIBA Africa Basketball League. The most common final was between the Angolan arch-rivals Petro de Luanda and Primeiro de Agosto, who faced each other four times.

Medals by country

MVP award winner

Clubs performance

See also
 FIBA Africa Championship
 Basketball in Africa
 Basketball Africa League

References

External links
  FIBA Africa
  African Basketball Champions Cup – goalzz.com

 
Basketball club competitions in Africa
International club basketball competitions
1972 establishments in Africa